{{DISPLAYTITLE:C26H45NO6S}}
The molecular formula C26H45NO6S (molar mass: 499.70 g/mol, exact mass: 499.2968 u) may refer to:

 Taurochenodeoxycholic acid
 Taurodeoxycholic acid
 Tauroursodeoxycholic acid (TUDCA)